Vivian Konadu Adjei (born 14 January 2000) is a Ghanaian footballer who plays as a forward for the Ghana women's national team.

Early life 
A native of Techiman in the Bono East Region of Ghana, Adjei had her junior and senior secondary school at the Kumasi Sports Academy JHS and SHS. The Kumasi Sports Academy is a football academy that offers formal education opportunities to young footballers whilst developing their skills as footballers.

Club career 
Adjei started her career with Ghana Women’s Premier League side Kumasi Sports Academy Ladies. She subsequently joined Thunder Queens and scored seven goals in the 2020–21 Ghana Women's Premier League ending the season as the club's top goal scorer. Most notable amongst those goals was when scored a late header in the 85th minute to give Thunder Queens a 2–1 victory over Immigration Ladies on 5 May 2021. She was adjudged as the woman of the match at the end of the 90 minutes.

International career

Youth 
Adjei has capped for Ghana at the U17 and senior level. In 2016, she  represented the Ghana U17 at the 2016 FIFA U-17 Women's World Cup along with players like Sandra Owusu-Ansah. She played three matches as Ghana were eliminated by South Korea in the quarter-finals.

Senior 
In July 2021, Adjei made the squad for the Aisha Buhari Cup and 2022 Africa Women Cup of Nations qualifiers against Nigeria. She made her senior debut during an Aisha Buhari Cup match against Cameroon women's national team on 20 September 2021. She marked the debut by scoring her first goal in the 89th minute of the match to help Ghana to a 2–0 victory.

See also
List of Ghana women's international footballers

References

External links 
 
 

Living people
2000 births
People from Bono East Region
Ghanaian women's footballers
Ghana women's international footballers
Ghanaian expatriate women's footballers
Ghanaian expatriate sportspeople in India
Expatriate women's footballers in India
Gokulam Kerala FC Women players
Women's association football forwards